Phostria purpuralis is a moth in the family Crambidae. It was described by Herbert Druce in 1895. It is found in Costa Rica.

The forewings and hindwings are uniform dark glossy purplish brown, the inner margin of the latter greyish black.

References

Phostria
Moths described in 1895
Moths of Central America